Diamond Rio is the eponymous debut studio album by the American country music band of the same name. Released in 1991 on Arista Records, it produced five chart singles on the Billboard country music charts: the Number One hit "Meet in the Middle", as well as the Top Ten hits "Mirror, Mirror", "Mama Don't Forget to Pray for Me", "Norma Jean Riley" and "Nowhere Bound". The album itself received RIAA platinum certification.

Track listing

Personnel 
Diamond Rio
 Marty Roe – acoustic guitars, lead vocals
 Dan Truman – keyboards
 Jimmy Olander – lead guitars, banjo
 Gene Johnson – mandolin, backing vocals
 Dana Williams – bass, backing vocals
 Brian Prout – drums

Production 
 Tim DuBois – producer 
 Monty Powell – producer 
 Mike Clute – engineer, mixing
 Chris Armstrong – assistant engineer
 Ted Greene – assistant engineer
 Paula Montondo – assistant engineer
 Doug Williams – assistant engineer
 Glenn Meadows – mastering
 Anthony Ranieri – art direction, design
 Peter Nash – photography

Charts

Weekly charts

Year-end charts

Singles

Certifications

References

1991 debut albums
Diamond Rio albums
Arista Records albums